The European Mid-Amateur Men's Championship is a European amateur golf championship opened to men aged 25 or plus years old, organized by the European Golf Association. 

The championship was introduced in 1991, with 30 editions contested so far. The event is played annually in conjunction with the European Mid-Amateur Ladies' Championship. The age limit lowered from 30 to 25 years old in 2021.

Format
The top 90 amateur players, aged from 25 years old, compete in a format consisting of three rounds of stroke play, with a cut after the second round out of which the lowest 54 men's scores can qualify for the final round.

Past results

''Source:

Multiple winners
3 wins: Hans-Günter Reiter
2 wins: Carlos de Corral, Markus Frank, Richard Heath, François Illouz, Gary Wolstenholme

See also
European Mid-Amateur Ladies' Championship – corresponding EGA event for women
U.S. Mid-Amateur Golf Championship – corresponding USGA event

References

External links
European Golf Association: Full results

Amateur golf tournaments
European Golf Association championships
Recurring sporting events established in 1991